The Ørestad Development Corporation was a company responsible for urban redevelopment of Ørestad south of Copenhagen, Denmark. The company was authorized by the Ørestad Act passed in 1992, and was established in 1993, co-owned by the Copenhagen Municipality (55%) and the Ministry of Finance (45%). It was also responsible for building parts of the Copenhagen Metro. The company was dissolved in 2007. Its Metro-related activities were taken over by the Metro Corporation, a newly formed company that consolidated ownership and operation of the Copenhagen Metro. Its redevelopment-related activities were merged into the Area Development Corporation.

References

Real estate companies of Denmark
Real estate companies established in 1993
Danish companies established in 1993
Companies disestablished in 2007